The Century of the Self is a 2002 British television documentary series by filmmaker Adam Curtis. It focuses on the work of psychoanalysts Sigmund Freud and Anna Freud, and PR consultant Edward Bernays. In episode one, Curtis says, "This series is about how those in power have used Freud's theories to try and control the dangerous crowd in an age of mass democracy."

Episodes 
 "Happiness Machines" (originally broadcast 17 March 2002)
 "The Engineering of Consent" (originally broadcast 24 March 2002)
 "There is a Policeman Inside All Our Heads; He Must Be Destroyed" (originally broadcast 31 March 2002)
 "Eight People Sipping Wine in Kettering" (originally broadcast 7 April 2002)

Overview 
Sigmund Freud, the founder of psychoanalysis, changed our perception of the mind and its workings. The documentary explores the various ways that governments, global organizations and corporations have used Freud's theories. Freud and his nephew Edward Bernays, who was the first to use psychological techniques in public relations, are discussed in part one. His daughter Anna Freud, a pioneer of child psychology, is mentioned in part two. Wilhelm Reich, an opponent of Freud's theories, is discussed in part three.

Along these lines, The Century of the Self asks deeper questions about the roots and methods of consumerism and commodification and their implications. It also questions the modern way people see themselves, the attitudes to fashion, and superficiality.

The business and political worlds use psychological techniques to read, create and fulfill the desires of the public, and to make their products and speeches as pleasing as possible to consumers and voters. Curtis questions the intentions and origins of this relatively new approach to engaging the public.

Where once the political process was about engaging people's rational, conscious minds, as well as facilitating their needs as a group, Stuart Ewen, a historian of public relations, argues that politicians now appeal to primitive impulses that have little bearing on issues outside the narrow self-interests of a consumer society.

The words of Paul Mazur, a leading Wall Street banker working for Lehman Brothers in 1927, are cited: "We must shift America from a needs- to a desires-culture. People must be trained to desire, to want new things, even before the old have been entirely consumed. [...] Man's desires must overshadow his needs."

In part four the main subjects are Philip Gould, a political strategist, and Matthew Freud, a PR consultant and the great-grandson of Sigmund Freud. In the 1990s, they were instrumental to bringing the Democratic Party in the US and New Labour in the United Kingdom back into power through use of the focus group, originally invented by psychoanalysts employed by US corporations to allow consumers to express their feelings and needs, just as patients do in psychotherapy.

Curtis ends by saying that, "Although we feel we are free, in reality, we—like the politicians—have become the slaves of our own desires," and compares Britain and America to 'Democracity', an exhibit at the 1939 New York World's Fair created by Edward Bernays.

Contributors

Music
 Aaron Copland: Billy the Kid (ballet)
 Arvo Pärt: Spiegel im Spiegel, Für Alina, Fratres
 Dmitri Shostakovich: 24 Preludes and Fugues (Shostakovich), Prelude 1 (C major)
 Johannes Brahms: Symphony No. 3 in F major, Op. 90, beginning of the third movement (poco allegretto)
 Kano: She's a Star (from the album New York Cake)
 Louis Armstrong: What a Wonderful World
 Ralph Vaughan Williams: Fantasia on a Theme by Thomas Tallis
 Raymond Scott: Portofino 2 (from Manhattan Research Inc.)
 The Gold Diggers' Song (We're in the Money) (from the film Gold Diggers of 1933)
 Ennio Morricone: Quelle foto (from the film Le foto proibite di una signora per bene)
 Felix Slatkin: The Green Leaves of Summer
 The John Barry Seven: Hit and Miss

Awards 
Best Documentary Series, Broadcast Awards
Historical Film of the Year, History Today Trust Awards

Nominated for:
Best Documentary Series, Royal Television Society
Best Documentary Series, Grierson Documentary Awards
Best Documentary, Indie Awards

References

External links 
 

 The Century of the Self – BBC Documentary (by Adam Curtis) by Dan Haggard in Reviews in Depth, 25 January 2010
 Episode guide:
 Happiness Machines at BBC Online (archive copy)
 The Engineering of Consent at BBC Online (archive copy)
 There is a Policeman Inside All Our Heads: He Must Be Destroyed at BBC Online (archive copy)
 Eight People Sipping Wine in Kettering at BBC Online (archive copy)

2002 British television series debuts
2002 British television series endings
2000s British documentary television series
BBC television documentaries about history during the 20th Century
2000s British television miniseries
Cognitive biases
Self
Works about public relations
Films about philosophy
English-language television shows